Collonista verruca is a species of sea snail, a marine gastropod mollusc in the family Colloniidae.

The shells of this species, known in Ni'ihau as kahelelaniʻilaʻula, are used to make leis.

Description
The size of the shell attains  4 mm. The small, solid shell has a short ovate-conic shape. it is imperforate or narrowly umbilicate. It is white with numerous revolving series of red or brown tessellations. The five whorls are spirally lirate. The lira is largest at the middle of the whorl and causes sometimes a slight carina there. The body whorl is slightly but abruptly deflected anteriorly. The circular  aperture is white. The white columella is arcuate and wide but not dentate below. The base of the shell has a minute internal denticle. Some specimens are almost entirely red; others are white, with red spots at the periphery. There is some variation in form, also, and in the prominence of the spiral riblets.

Distribution
This marine species occurs in Oceania and Indo-Malaysia. The type species was found off Hawaii.

References

 Poppe G.T., Tagaro S.P. & Stahlschmidt P. (2015). New shelled molluscan species from the central Philippines I. Visaya. 4(3): 15–59.

External links
 http://www.manandmollusc.net/Niihau/Leptothyra-verruca.html
 
 Gould A.A. (1845). Descriptions of species of land shells, from the Sandwich Islands, supposed to be hitherto undescribed. Proceedings of the Boston Society of Natural History. 2: 26-28
 Pease W. H. (1869). Description of new species of marine Gasteropodæ inhabiting Polynesia. American Journal of Conchology. 5: 64-79
 Pilsbry, H. A. (1921). Marine mollusks of Hawaii, XIV-XV. Proceedings of The Academy of Natural Sciences of Philadelphia. 72: 360-383

Colloniidae
Niihau
Gastropods described in 1845